The 2014 Ontario general election was held on June 12, 2014, to elect the members of the 41st Parliament of Ontario. The Liberal Party won a majority of seats in the legislature, allowing its leader, Kathleen Wynne, to continue as premier, moving from a minority to majority government. This was the Liberals' fourth consecutive win since 2003 and an improvement from their performance in the 2011 election. The Progressive Conservatives under Tim Hudak were returned to the official opposition; following the election loss, Hudak announced his resignation as Progressive Conservative leader. The New Democratic Party under Andrea Horwath remained in third place, albeit with an improved share of the popular vote.

The election was called on May 2, 2014, by Lieutenant Governor David Onley, upon the recommendation of Wynne following the announcement that the NDP, whose support was critical to the survival of the Liberals' minority government in the Legislative Assembly, would vote against the Liberals' proposed budget.

With the election, Wynne became the first lesbian woman to lead her party to a majority victory in an Ontario general election.

Results

Summary analysis

Pairing off the top three parties, swings were calculated to be:

 PC to Liberal: 2.6%
 PC to NDP: 2.6%
 Liberal to NDP: insignificant

Regional analysis

Detailed analysis

Principal races

Marginal seats
The following seats had a margin of victory of less than 5 percentage points in the election:

Maps

Timeline (2011–2014)

Seat changes

Other developments

Opinion polls

Voting intention polls released throughout the election campaign were distinctly inconsistent and contradictory, as shown in the graph and table below. During much of the campaign, different pollsters persistently disagreed, frequently by important margins, on whether the Liberals or Progressive Conservatives held the lead, though by the final days most polls showed the Liberals marginally to comfortably ahead. Still, polls completed on the last day of the campaign by Ipsos Reid and EKOS showed vastly divergent support for the NDP, at 30% and 19%, respectively. Also of note, although four different pollsters released results among "likely voters" alongside their results among all eligible voters in an effort to better predict the outcome of the election based on expected voter turnout, in all cases the former proved to be overall poorer predictors than the latter.

General opinion polls

Innovative Research states, for Province Wide Online Survey, "Margin of error not applicable, online samples not random."
Data shown above for campaign-period polls are top-line results, typically among all eligible voters. However, certain pollsters additionally report results among "likely voters" in an effort to better predict the actual outcome of the election. When available, these alternative results are shown in the following table:

Likely voters

Pre-campaign period

Incumbents not running for reelection

Candidates by region

East

Ottawa

|-
| style="background:whitesmoke;"|Carleton—
Total votes: 64,420 
|
|Rosalyn Stevens  20,472 (31.78%) 
||
|Jack MacLaren  30,590 (47.49%) 
|
|John Hansen  8,744 (13.57%) 
|
|Andrew West  4,614 (7.16%) 
|
|
|
|
||
|Jack MacLaren
|-
| style="background:whitesmoke;"|Nepean—Carleton
Total votes: 66,073 
|
|Jack Uppal  21,974 (33.26%) 
||
|Lisa MacLeod  30,901 (46.77%)
|
|Ric Dagenais  8,628 (13.06%) 
|
|Gordon Kubanek  3,630 (5.49%) 
|
|Coreen Corcoran  940 (1.42%) 
|
|
||
|Lisa MacLeod
|-
| style="background:whitesmoke;"|Ottawa Centre
Total votes: 53,232 
||
|Yasir Naqvi  27,689 (52.02%) 
|
|Rob Dekker  9,678 (18.18%) 
|
|Jennifer McKenzie  10,894 (20.47%) 
|
|Kevin O'Donnell  4,163 (7.82%) 
|
|Bruce Faulkner  525 (0.99%) 
|
|Larry Wasslen  283 (0.53%) 
||
|Yasir Naqvi
|-
| style="background:whitesmoke;"|Ottawa—Orléans
Total votes: 55,905 
||
|Marie-France Lalonde  29,911 (53.50%) 
|
|Andrew Lister  18,525 (33.14%) 
|
|Prosper M'Bemba-Meka  5,022 (8.98%) 
|
|Bob Bell  2,036 (3.64%) 
|
|Gerald Bourdeau  411 (0.74%) 
|
|
||
|Phil McNeely†
|-
| style="background:whitesmoke;"|Ottawa South
Total votes: 47,450 
||
|John Fraser  23,708 (49.96%) 
|
|Matt Young  15,235 (32.11%) 
|
|Bronwyn Funiciello  5,817 (12.26%) 
|
|Matt Lakatos-Hayward  2,034 (4.29%) 
|
|Jean-Serge Brisson  273 (0.58%) 
|
|Espoir Manirambona  139 (0.29%) 
John Redins  244 (0.51%) 
||
|John Fraser
|-
| style="background:whitesmoke;"|Ottawa—Vanier
Total votes: 39,261 
||
|Madeleine Meilleur  21,810 (55.55%) 
|
|Martin Forget  8,750 (22.29%) 
|
|Hervé Ngamby  5,228 (13.32%) 
|
|David Bagler  3,144 (8.01&) 
|
|Phillip Richard  329 (0.84%) 
|
|
||
|Madeleine Meilleur
|-
| style="background:whitesmoke;"|Nepean
Total votes: 46,907 
||
|Bob Chiarelli  21,035 (44.84%) 
|
|Randall Denley  15,895 (33.89%) 
|
|Alex Cullen  6,760 (14.41%) 
|
|Alex Hill  2,899 (6.18%) 
|
|Matthew Brooks  318 (0.68%) 
|
|
||
|Bob Chiarelli
|}

Eastern Ontario

|-
| style="background:whitesmoke;"|Russell
Total votes: 47,357 
||
|Grant Crack  23,565 (49.74%) 
|
|Roxane Villeneuve Robertson  15,429 (32.57%) 
|
|Isabelle Sabourin  5,902 (12.46%) 
|
|Raymond St. Martin  1,528 (3.23%) 
|
|Darcy Neal Donnelly  422 (0.89%) 
|
|
Marc-Antoine Gagnier (Independent),  296 (0.92%) 
Carl Leduc  233 (0.49%) 
||
|Grant Crack
|-
| style="background:whitesmoke;"|Kingston and the Islands
Total votes: 50,109 
||
|Sophie Kiwala  20,838 (41.59%) 
|
|Mark Bain  10,652 (21.26%) 
|
|Mary Rita Holland  14,811 (29.56%) 
|
|Robert Kiley  3,566 (7.12%) 
|
|
|
|Jonathan Reid  242 (0.48%) 
||
|John Gerretsen†
|-
| style="background:whitesmoke;"| Addington
Total votes: 50,470 
|
|Bill MacDonald  15,037 (29.79%) 
||
|Randy Hillier  21,966 (43.52%) 
|
|Dave Parkhill  10,184 (20.18%) 
|
|Cam Mather  3,283 (6.50%) 
|
|
|
|
||
|Randy Hillier
|-
| style="background:whitesmoke;"|Grenville
Total votes: 41,472 
|
|Christine Milks  8,499 (20.49%) 
||
|Steve Clark  23,523 (56.07%) 
|
|David Lundy  7,219 (17.41%) 
|
|Steve Bowering  2,030 (4.89%)  
|
|Harold Gabriel  471 (1.14%) 
|
|
||
|Steve Clark
|-
| style="background:whitesmoke;"|Prince Hastings
Total votes: 46,218 
|
|Georgina Thompson  15,105 (32.68%) 
||
|Todd Smith  19,281 (41.72%) 
|
|Merrill Stewart  8,829 (19.11%) 
|
|Anita Payne  2,448 (5.28%) 
|
|Lindsay Forbes  555 (1.20%) 
|
|
||
|Todd Smith
|-
| style="background:whitesmoke;"|Pembroke
Total votes: 41,334 
|
|Rod Boileau  7,897 (19.11%) 
||
|John Yakabuski  25,241 (61.07%) 
|
|Brian Dougherty  5,978 (14.46%) 
|
|Benjamin Wright   1,337 (3.23%) 
|
|
|
|
Chad Beckwith-Smith (Independent),  392 (0.95%) 
Murray Reid  489 (1.18%) 
||
|John Yakabuski
|-
| style="background:whitesmoke;"|South Glengarry
Total votes: 39,879 
|
|John Earle  9,250 (23.20%) 
||
|Jim McDonell  20,624 (51.73%) 
|
|Elaine MacDonald  8,336 (20.88%)
|
|Sharron Norman  1,067 (2.68%) 
|
|Shawn McRae  602 (1.51%) 
|
|
||
|Jim McDonell
|}

Central Ontario

|-
| style="background:whitesmoke;"|Barrie
Total votes: 48,942 
||
|Ann Hoggarth  19,916 (40.69%) 
|
|Rod Jackson  17,667 (36.10%) 
|
|David Bradbury  7.975 (16.29%) 
|
|Bonnie North  3.018 (6.17%) 
|
|Darren Roskam  366 (0.75%) 
|
|
||
|Rod Jackson
|-
| style="background:whitesmoke;"|Owen Sound
Total vote: 42,816 
|
|Ellen Anderson  11,586 (27.06%) 
||
|Bill Walker  20,359 (47.55%) 
|
|Karen Gventer  6,787 (15.85%) 
|
|Jenny Parsons  3,696 (8.63%) 
|
|Caleb Voskamp  188 (0.44%) 
|
|Jamie D. Spence  200 (0.47%)
||
|Bill Walker
|-
| style="background:whitesmoke;"|Caledon
Total votes: 45,203 
|
|Bobbie Daid  13,861 (30.66%) 
||
|Sylvia Jones  18,017 (39.86%) 
|
|Rehya Rebecca Yazbek  5,269 (11.66%) 
|
|Karren Wallace  7,518 (16.63%) 
|
|Daniel Kowalewski  538 (1.19%) 
|
|
||
|Sylvia Jones
|-
| style="background:whitesmoke;"|Durham
Total votes: 54,366 
||
|Granville Anderson  19,816 (36.45%) 
|
|Mike Patrick  18,640 (34.29%) 
|
|Derek Spence  13,094 (24.08%) 
|
|Halyna Zalucky  2,382 (4.26%) 
|
|Conner Toye  434 (0.90%) 
|
|
||
|John O'Toole†
|-
| style="background:whitesmoke;"|Kawartha Brock
Total votes: 52,839 
|
|Rick Johnson  18,512 (35.03%) 
||
|Laurie Scott  21,641 (41.09%) 
|
|Don Abel  10,431 (19.74%) 
|
|Arsalan Ahmad  2,255 (4.27%) 
|
|
|
|
||
|Laurie Scott
|-
| style="background:whitesmoke;"|Aurora
Total votes: 52,233 
||
|Chris Ballard  22,997 (43.94%) 
|
|Jane Twinney  19,585 (37.42%) 
|
|Angus Duff  6,023 (11.51%) 
|
|Andrew Roblin  2,144 (4.10%) 
|
|Jason Jenkins  579 (1.11%) 
|
|
Dorian Baxter,  922 (1.76%) 
Bob Yaciuk  83 (0.16%) 
||
|Frank Klees†
|-
| style="background:whitesmoke;"|
Total votes: 54,496 
||
|Lou Rinaldi  23,419 (42.97%) 
|
|Rob Milligan  19,583 (35.93%) 
|
|Kira Mees  9,211 (16.91%) 
|
|Gudrun Ludorf-Weaver  2,283 (4.19%) 
|
|
|
|
||
|Rob Milligan
|-
| style="background:whitesmoke;"|Peterborough
Total votes: 53,311 
||
|Jeff Leal  24,709 (46.33%) 
|
|Scott Stewart  15,907 (29,803) 
|
|Sheila Wood  9,728 (18.24%) 
|
|Gary Beamish  2,287 (4.19%) 
|
|
|
|
Andrea Gar Quiano,  132 (0.25%) 
Wayne Matheson,  121 (0.23%) 
Gerard Faux,  52 (0.10%) 
Brian Martindale (Independent)  395 (0.74%) 
||
|Jeff Leal
|-
| style="background:whitesmoke;"|Simcoe—Grey
Total votesL 55,152 
|
|Lorne Kenney  17,199 (31.18%) 
||
|Jim Wilson  25,988 (47.12%) 
|
|David Matthews  7,793 (14.13%) 
|
|Jesseca Dudun  4,172 (7.56%) 
|
|
|
|
||
|Jim Wilson
|-
| style="background:whitesmoke;"|Simcoe North
Total votes: 50,451 
|
|Fred Larsen  16,413 (32.53%) 
||
|Garfield Dunlop  22,179 (43.96%) 
|
|Doris Middleton  7,896 (15.55%) 
|
|Peter Stubbins  4,013 (7.95%) 
|
|
|
|
||
|Garfield Dunlop
|-
| style="background:whitesmoke;"|York—Simcoe
Total votes: 47,086 
|
|Loralea Carruthers  16,276 (34.53%) 
||
|Julia Munro  19,025 (40.40%) 
|
|Laura Bowman  8,420 (17.88%) 
|
|Peter Elgie  2,046 (6.26%) 
|
|Craig Wallace  419 (0.89%) 
|
|
||
|Julia Munro
|}

905 Belt

Durham & York

|-
| style="background:whitesmoke;"|Pickering
Total votes: 51,420 
||
|Joe Dickson  26,251 (51.06%) 
|
|Todd McCarthy  14,999 (29.17%) 
|
|Jermaine King  8,274 (16.09%) 
|
|Adam Narraway  1,589 (3.09%) 
|
|Kyle Stewart  301 (0.59%) 
|
|
||
|Joe Dickson
|-
| style="background:whitesmoke;"|Unionville
Total votes: 41,916 
||
|Michael Chan  21,517 (51.33%) 
|
|Shan Thayaparan  14,241 (33.98%) 
|
|Nadine Kormos Hawkins  4,205 (10.03%) 
|
|Myles O'Brien  1,509 (3.60%) 
|
|Allen Small  444 (1.06%) 
|
|
||
|Michael Chan
|-
| style="background:whitesmoke;"|Markham
Total votes: 80,755 
||
|Helena Jaczek  36,782 (45.55%) 
|
|Farid Wassef  30,256 (37.47%) 
|
|Miles Krauter  9,355 (11.58%) 
|
|Emilia Melara  2,791 (3.46%) 
|
|Karl Boelling  1,358 (1.68%) 
|
|Gennady Vilensky  213 (0.26%) 
||
|Helena Jaczek
|-
| style="background:whitesmoke;"|Oshawa
Total votes: 47,608 
|
|Esrick Quintyn  9,051 (19.01%)
|
|Jerry Ouellette  14,540 (30.54%) 
||
|Jennifer French  22,232 (46.70%)
|
|Becky Smit  1,785 (3.75%) 
|
|
|
|
||
|Jerry Ouellette
|-
| style="background:whitesmoke;"|
Total votes: 44,662 
||
|Tracy MacCharles  23,206 (51.95%) 
|
|Kevin Gaudet  12,638 (28.30%) 
|
|Eileen Higdon  6,600 (14.78%) 
|
|Anthony Navarro  1,564 (3.50%) 
|
|Scott Hoefig  463 (1.03%) 
|
|Matt Oliver  191 (0.43%) 
||
|Tracy MacCharles
|-
| style="background:whitesmoke;"|Richmond Hill
Total votes: 42,808 
||
|Reza Moridi  20,455 (47.78%) 
|
|Vic Gupta  15,642 
|
|Adam DeVita  4,697 (10.97%) 
|
|Rachael Lave  1,344 (3.14%) 
|
|Igor Bily  510 (1.19%) 
|
|Yuri Duboisky  160 (0.37%) 
||
|Reza Moridi
|-
| style="background:whitesmoke;"|Thornhill
Total votes: 49,751 
|
|Sandra Yeung Racco  21,780 (43.78%) 
||
|Gila Martow  21,886 (43.99%) 
|
|Cindy Hackelberg  4,052 (8.14%) 
|
|David Bergart  1,229 (2.47%) 
|
|Gene Balfour  571 (1.15%) 
|
|Erin Goodwin  233 (0.49%) 
||
|Gila Martow
|-
| style="background:whitesmoke;"|Vaughan
Total votes: 60,269 
||
|Steven Del Duca  33,877 (56.21%) 
|
|Peter Meffe  16,989 (28.17%) 
|
|Marco Coletta  6,942 (11.52%) 
|
|Matthew Pankhurst  1,350 (2.24%) 
|
|Paolo Fabrizio  1,121 (1.86%) 
|
|
||
|Steven Del Duca
|-
| style="background:whitesmoke;"|Oshawa
Total votes: 59,110 
|
|Ajay Krishnan  18,617 (31.50%) 
||
|Christine Elliott  24,027 (40.65%) 
|
|Ryan Kelly  13,621 (23.04%) 
|
|Stacey Leadbetter  2,523 (4.27%) 
|
|
|
|Douglas Thom  322 (0.54%) 
||
|Christine Elliott
|}

Brampton, Mississauga & Oakville

|-
| style="background:whitesmoke;"|Malton
Total votes: 53,072 
|
|Kuldip Kular  17,873 (33.68%) 
|
|Harjit Jaswal  9,403 (17.72%) 
||
|Jagmeet Singh  23,519 (44.31%) 
|
|Pauline Thornham  2,277 (4.29%) 
|
| 
|
|
||
|Jagmeet Singh
|-
| style="background:whitesmoke;"|Springdale
Total votes: 42,250 
||
|Harinder Malhi  16,927 (40.06%) 
|
|Pam Hundal  10,117 (23.95%) 
|
|Gurpreet Dhillon  13,513 (31.98%) 
|
|Laila Zarrabi Yan  1,311 (3.10%) 
|
| 
|
|Elizabeth Hill  382 (0.90%) 
|
|Vacant
|-
| style="background:whitesmoke;"|Brampton West
Total votes: 54,902 
||
|Vic Dhillon  24,832 (45.23%) 
|
|Randeep Sandhu  13,363 (24.34%) 
|
|Gugni Gill Panaich  12,985 (23.65%) 
|
|Sayyeda Ebrahim  1,504 (2.74%) 
|
|Luis Chacin  878 (1.60%) 
|
|
Ted Harlson,  540 (0.98%) 
Dan Sullivan  800 (1.46%) 
||
|Vic Dhillon
|-
| style="background:whitesmoke;"|
Total votes: 41,323 
||
|Amrit Mangat  19,923 (48.21%) 
|
|Amarjeet Gill  11,251 (27.23%) 
|
|Kevin Troake  6,906 (16.72%) 
|
|Kathy Acheson  1,302 (3.15%) 
|
|Richard Levesque  993 (2.40%) 
|
|
Robert Alilovic (Independent),  351 (0.85%)  
Kathleen Vezina  597 (1.45%) 
||
|Amrit Mangat
|-
| style="background:whitesmoke;"|Cooksville
Total votes: 40,001 
||
|Dipika Damerla  20,934 (52.33%) 
|
|Zoran Churchin  10,479 (26.20%) 
|
|Fayaz Karim  6,158 (15.39%) 
|
|Linh Nguyen  1,408 (3.52%) 
|
|Levko Iwanusiw  788 (1.57%) 
|
|Dolly Catena  234 (0.54%) 
||
|Dipika Damerla
|-
| style="background:whitesmoke;"|Erindale
Total votes: 51,764 
||
|Harinder Takhar  25,356 (48.98%) 
|
|Jeff White  15,474 (29.89%) 
|
|Michelle Bilek  7,730 (14.93%) 
|
|Vivek Gupta  1,216 (2.35%) 
|
|Christopher Jewell  873 (1.69%) 
|
|
Nabila Kiyani,  474 (0.92%) 
Greg Vezina  641 (1.24%) 
||
|Harinder Takhar
|-
| style="background:whitesmoke;"|Mississauga South
Total votes: 43,719 
||
|Charles Sousa  22,192 (50.76%) 
|
|Effie Triantafilopoulos  14,514 (33.20%) 
|
|Boris Rosolak  4,649 (10.63%) 
|
|Lloyd Jones  1,418 (3.24%) 
|
|James Judson  355 (0.81%) 
|
|Andrew Weber  591 (1.35%) 
||
|Charles Sousa
|-
| style="background:whitesmoke;"|Streetsville
Total votes: 42,964 
||
|Bob Delaney  22,587 (52.57%) 
|
|Nina Tangri  12,060 (28.07%) 
|
|Anju Sikka  5,885 (13.70%) 
|
|Scott Warner  1,566 (3.64%) 
|
|David Walach  342 (0.80%) 
|
|Alexander Vezina  524 (1.22%) 
||
|Bob Delaney
|-
| style="background:whitesmoke;"|Oakville
Total votes: 50,037 
||
|Kevin Flynn  24,717 (49.40%) 
|
|Larry Scott  18,921 (37.81%) 
|
|Che Marville  3,994 (7.98%) 
|
|Andrew Chlobowski  1,887 (3.77%) 
|
|David Clement  386 (0.77%) 
|
|Silvio Ursomarzo  132 (0.26%) 
||
|Kevin Flynn
|}

Toronto

Scarborough

|-
| style="background:whitesmoke;"|Agincourt
Total votes: 34,772 
||
|Soo Wong  17,332 (49.84%) 
|
|Liang Chen  12,041 (34.63%) 
|
|Alex Wilson  4,105 (11.81%) 
|
|Pauline Thompson  907 (2.61%) 
|
|Kevin Clarke  387 (1.11%) 
||
|Soo Wong
|-
| style="background:whitesmoke;"|Scarborough Centre
Total votes: 35,220 
||
|Brad Duguid  19,390 (55.05%) 
|
|David Ramalho  7,599 (21.58%) 
|
|Carol Baker  7,145 (20.29%) 
|
|Edward Yaghledjian  1,086 (3.08%) 
|
|
||
|Brad Duguid
|-
| style="background:whitesmoke;"|Guildwood
Total votes: 34,711 
||
|Mitzie Hunter  17,318 (49.89%) 
|
|Ken Kirupa  9,721 (28.01%) 
|
|Shuja Syed  5,894 (16.98%) 
|
|Jeffrey W.R. Bustard  1,034 (2.98%) 
|
|
Richard Kerr,  476 (1.37%) 
Khalid Mokhtarzada,  148 (0.43%) 
 John Sawdon  120 (0.35%) 
||
|Mitzie Hunter
|-
| style="background:whitesmoke;"|Rouge River
Total votes: 41,583 
||
|Bas Balkissoon  16,095 (38.71%) 
|
|Raymond Cho  11,500 (27.66%) 
|
|Neethan Shan  13,019 (31.31%) 
|
|George B. Singh  571 (1.37%) 
|
|Amir Khan  398 (0.96%) 
||
|Bas Balkissoon
|-
| style="background:whitesmoke;"|Scarborough Southwest
Total votes: 36,673 
||
|Lorenzo Berardinetti  18,420 (50.23%) 
|
|Nita Kang  7,573 (20.65%) 
|
|Jessie Macaulay  8,674 (23.65%) 
|
|David Del Grande  1,493 (5.30%) 
|
|
Tyler Rose,  328 (0.89%)
 Jean-Baptiste Foaleng (Independent)  185 (0.50%) 
||
|Lorenzo Berardinetti
|}

North York and North Toronto

|-
| style="background:whitesmoke;"|Don Valley East
Total votes: 34,548 
||
|Michael Coteau  19,248 (55.71%) 
|
|Angela Kennedy  9,257 (26.80%) 
|
|Akil Sadikali  4,500 (13.03%) 
|
|Christopher McLeod  1,256 (3.64%) 
|
|Wayne Simmons  287 (0.83%) 
|
|
||
|Michael Coteau
|-
| style="background:whitesmoke;"|Don Valley West
Total votes: 45,980 
||
|Kathleen Wynne  26,215 (57.01%) 
|
|David Porter  14,082 (30/63%) 
|
|Khalid Ahmed  3,569 (7.76%) 
|
|Louis Fliss  1,286 (2.80%) 
|
|Tracy Curley  83 (0.18%) 
|
|
Dimitrios Kabitsis,  153 (0.35%) 
Patrick Boyd,  338 (0.74%) 
Brock Burrows (Independent),  138 (0.30%) 
Rosemary Waigh  116 (0/25%) 
||
|Kathleen Wynne
|-
| style="background:whitesmoke;"|Eglinton—Lawrence
Total votes: 41,706 
||
|Michael Colle  22,855 (54.80%) 
|
|Robin Martin  14,709 (35.27%) 
|
|Thomas Gallezot  3,060 (7.33%) 
|
|Lucas C. McCann  1,305 (3.13%) 
|
|Michael Bone  264 (0.63%) 
|
|Erwin Sniedzins (Independent)  143 (0.34%) 
||
|Michael Colle
|-
| style="background:whitesmoke;"|Willowdale
Total votes: 46,219 
||
|David Zimmer  24,300 (52.58%) 
|
|Michael Ceci  15,468 (33.47%) 
|
|Alexander Brown  4,693 (10.15%) 
|
|Teresa Pun  1,758 (3.80%) 
|
|
|
|
||
|David Zimmer
|-
| style="background:whitesmoke;"|York Centre
Total votes: 35,361 
||
|Monte Kwinter  16,935 (47.89%) 
|
|Avi Yufest  11,125 (31.46%) 
|
|John Fagan  5,645 (15.96%) 
|
|Josh Borenstein  1,163 (3.29%) 
|
|Laurence Cherniak  493 (1.39%) 
|
|
||
|Monte Kwinter
|}

Toronto & East York

|-
| style="background:whitesmoke;"|
Total votes: 42,948 
||
|Arthur Potts  17,218 (40.09%) 
|
|Nicolas Johnson  5,982 (13.93%) 
|
|Michael Prue  16,737 (38.93%) 
|
|Debra Scott  2,329 (5.42%) 
|
|Alex Lindsay  524 (1.22%) 
|
|Naomi Poley-Fisher  158 (0.37%) 
|
|
||
|Michael Prue
|-
| style="background:whitesmoke;"|Davenport
Total votes: 35,674 
||
|Cristina Martins  16,272 (45.61%) 
|
|Lan Daniel  2,665 (7.47%) 
|
|Jonah Schein  14,322 (40.15%) 
|
|Daniel Stein  1,784 (5.00%) 
|
|Nunzio Venuto  250 (0.70%) 
|
|Franz Cauchi  110 (0.31%) 
|
|
Mariam Ahmad,  172 (0.48%) 
 Troy Young  99 (0.28%) 
||
|Jonah Schein
|-
| style="background:whitesmoke;"|St. Paul's
Total votes: 50,261 
||
|Eric Hoskins  30,027 (59.74%) 
|
|Justine Deluce  12,037 (23.95%) 
|
|Luke Savage  5,056 (10.06%) 
|
|Josh Rachlis  2,569 (5.11%) 
|
|John Kittredge  407 (0.81%) 
|
|Mike Rita  165 (0.33%) 
|
|
||
|Eric Hoskins
|-
| style="background:whitesmoke;"|Toronto Centre
Total votes: 51,195  
||
|Glen Murray  29,935 (58.47%) 
|
|Martin Abell  9,498 (18.55%) 
|
|Kate Sellar  8,140 (15.90%) 
|
|Mark Daye  2,265 (4.42%) 
|
|Judi Falardeau  551 (1.08%) 
|
|Chris Goodwin  137 (0.27%) 
|
|
Lada Alekseychuk,  200 (0.39%) 
 Drew Garvie,  163 (0.32%) 
 Robin Nurse,  76 (0.15%) 
 Harvey Rotenberg,  152 (0.30%) 
 Bahman Yazdanfar  78 (0.15%) 
||
|Glen Murray
|-
| style="background:whitesmoke;"|Danforth
Total votes: 43,017 
|
|Rob Newman  15,983 (37.16%) 
|
|Naomi Solomon  4,304 (10.01%) 
||
|Peter Tabuns  19,190 (44.61%) 
|
|Rachel Power  2,351 (5.47%) 
|
|Thomas Armstrong  501 (1.16%) 
|
|Tristan Parlette  121 (0.28%) 
|
|
Elizabeth Rowley,  172 (0.40%) 
 Ali Azaroghli,  79 (0.18%) 
 Simon Luisi,  149 (0.35%) 
 John Richardson  167 (0.39%) 
||
|Peter Tabuns
|-
| style="background:whitesmoke;"|Spadina
Total votes: 57,434 
||
|Han Dong  26,613 (46.34%) 
|
|Roberta Scott  8,035 (13.99%) 
|
|Rosario Marchese  17,442 (30.37%) 
|
|Tim Grant  4,033 (7.02%) 
|
|Andrew Echevarria  734 (1.28%) 
|
|
|
|
Paul Figueiras,  307 (0.53%) 
 Dan King  270 (0.74%) 
||
|Rosario Marchese
|}

Etobicoke & York

|-
| style="background:whitesmoke;"|Etobicoke Centre
Total votes: 47,432 
||
|Yvan Baker  23,848 (50.28%) 
|
|Pina Martino  15,520 (32.72%) 
|
|Chris Jones  5,758 (12.14%) 
|
|George Morrison  1,254 (2.64%) 
|
|Alexander T. Bussmann  528 (1.11%) 
|
|Andrew Kuess  189 (0.40%) 
|
|
John J. Martins,  193 (0.41%) 
 Felicia Trigiani  142 (0.30%) 
||
|Donna Cansfield†
|-
| style="background:whitesmoke;"|Lakeshore
Total votes: 51,193 
||
|Peter Milczyn  24,311 (47.49%) 
|
|Doug Holyday  17,587 (34.35%) 
|
|P. C. Choo  6,362 (12.43%) 
|
|Angela Salewsky  2,064 (4.03%) 
|
|Mark Wrzesniewski  336 (0.66%) 
|
|Jeff Merklinger  189 (0.37%) 
|
|
Natalie Lochwin,  236 (0.46%) 
 Ian Lytvyn  108 (0.21%) 
||
|Doug Holyday
|-
| style="background:whitesmoke;"|Etobicoke North
Total votes: 27,098 
||
|Shafiq Qaadri  12,168 (44.90%) 
|
|Tony Milone  6,163 (22.74%) 
|
|Nigel Barriffe  7,103 (26.21%) 
|
|Kenny Robertson  677 (2.50%) 
|
|Allan deRoo  706 (2.61%) 
|
|James McConnell  281 (1.04%) 
|
|
||
|Shafiq Qaadri
|-
| style="background:whitesmoke;"|
Total votes: 45,093 
|
|Nancy Leblanc  17,841 (39.56%) 
|
|Jamie Ellerton  5,787 (12.83%) 
||
|Cheri DiNovo  18,385 (40.77%) 
|
|Tim Rudkins  2,479 (5.50%) 
|
|Redmond Weissenberger  191 (0.42%) 
|
|Melanie Motz  105 (0.23%) 
|
|Matthew Vezina  305 (0.68%) 
||
|Cheri DiNovo
|-
| style="background:whitesmoke;"|Weston
Total votes: 32,748 
||
|Laura Albanese  15,669 (47.85%) 
|
|Andrew Ffrench  3,687 (11.26%) 
|
|Paul Ferreira  12,200 (37.25%) 
|
|Jessica Higgins  797 (2.43%) 
|
|
|
|Eric Compton  249 (0.76%) 
|
|Abi Issa (Independent)  146 (0.45%) 
||
|Laura Albanese
|-
| style="background:whitesmoke;"|York West
Total votes: 25,494 
||
|Mario Sergio  11,907 (46.71%) 
|
|Karlene Nation  2,794 (10.96%) 
|
|Tom Rakocevic  9,997 (39.21%) 
|
|Keith Jarrett  418 (1.64%) 
|
|
|
|Kayla Baptiste  267 (1.05%) 
|
|Wally Schwauss (Independent)  111 (0.44%) 
||
|Mario Sergio
|}

Hamilton, Burlington & Niagara

|-
| style="background:whitesmoke;"|Westdale
Total votes: 53,959 
||
|Ted McMeekin  24,042 (44.56%) 
|
|Donna Skelly  18,252 (33.83%) 
|
|Alex Johnstone  8,415 (15.60%) 
|
|Raymond Dartsch  2,639 (4.89%) 
|
|Glenn Langton  423 (0.78%) 
|
|Barry Spruce
||
|Ted McMeekin
|-
| style="background:whitesmoke;"|Burlington
Total votes: 54,309 
||
|Eleanor McMahon  23,573 (43.41%) 
|
|Jane McKenna  20,086 (36.98%) 
|
|Jan Mowbray  7,792 (14.38%) 
|
|Meredith Cross  2,250 (4.14%) 
|
|Charles Zach  363 (0.67%) 
|
|Andrew Brannan  245 (0.45%) 
||
|Jane McKenna
|-
| style="background:whitesmoke;"|Halton
Total votes: 75,299 
||
|Indira Naidoo-Harris  33,724 (44.79%) 
|
|Ted Chudleigh  27,937 (37.10%) 
|
|Nik Spohr  9,758 (12.96%) 
|
|Susan Farrant  2,618 (3.48%) 
|
|Kal Ghory  916 (1.22%) 
|
|Gerry Marsh  346 (0.46%) 
||
|Ted Chudleigh
|-
| style="background:whitesmoke;"|Hamilton Centre
Total votes: 35,950 
|
|Donna Tiqui-Shebib  8,450 (23.50%) 
|
|John Vail  5,173 (14.39%) 
||
|Andrea Horwath  18,697 (52.01%) 
|
|Peter Ormond  3,067 (8.53%) 
|
| 
|
|
Bob Mann,  229 (0.58%) 
Peter Melanson  334 (0.93%) 
||
|Andrea Horwath
|-
| style="background:whitesmoke;"|
Total votes: 42,637 
|
|Ivan Luksic  12,433 (29.16%) 
|
|David Brown  7,574 (17.76%) 
||
|Paul Miller  19,958 (48.61%) 
|
|Gregory Zink  1,742 (4.09%) 
|
|Mark Burnison  676 (1.59%) 
|
|Britney Anne Johnston  254 (0.60%) 
||
|Paul Miller
|-
| style="background:whitesmoke;"|Hamilton Mountain
Total votes: 49,055 
|
|Javid Mirza  14,508 (29.57%) 
|
|Albert Marshall  8,795 (17.93%) 
||
|Monique Taylor  23,066 (46.90%) 
|
|Greg Lenko  2,047 (4.17%) 
|
|Hans Wienhold  379 (0.77%) 
|
|Brian Goodwin  320 (0.65%) 
||
|Monique Taylor
|-
| style="background:whitesmoke;"|Niagara Falls
Total votes: 50,923 
|
|Lionel Tupman  7,329 (14.39%) 
|
|Bart Maves  16,702 (32.80%) 
||
|Wayne Gates  24,131 (47.39%) 
|
|Clarke Bitter  1,724 (3.39%) 
|
|Ralph Panucci  559 (1.10%) 
|
|John Ringo Beam  478 (0.94%) 
||
|Wayne Gates
|-
| style="background:whitesmoke;"|Glanbrook
Total votes: 55,902 
|
|David Mossey  15,843 (28.34%) 
||
|Tim Hudak  23,378 (41.82%) 
|
|Brian McCormack  12,423 (22.22%) 
|
|Basia Krzyzanowski  3,004 (5.37%) 
|
|Stefanos Karatopis  970 (1.74%) 
|
|Geoff Peacock  284 (0.51%) 
||
|Tim Hudak
|-
| style="background:whitesmoke;"|St. Catharines
Total votes: 46,514 
||
|Jim Bradley  19,070 (41.00%) 
|
|Mat Siscoe  13,814 (29.70%) 
|
|Jennie Stevens  11,350 (24.40%) 
|
|Karen Fraser  1,792 (3.85%) 
|
|Nicholas Dushko  223 (0.48%) 
|
|
Saleh Waziruddin,  95 (0.20%) 
Dave Unrau  170 (0.30%) 
||
|Jim Bradley
|-
| style="background:whitesmoke;"|Welland
Total votes: 45,653 
|
|Benoit Mercier  9,060 (19.85%) 
|
|Frank Campion  12,933 (28.33%) 
||
|Cindy Forster  21,326 (46.71%) 
|
|Donna Cridland  1,874 (4.10%) 
|
|Andrea J. Murik  460 (1.01%) 
|
|
||
|Cindy Forster
|}

Midwestern Ontario

|-
| style="background:whitesmoke;"|Brant
Total votes: 51,544 
||
|Dave Levac  19,936 (37.63%) 
|
|Phil Gillies  15,447 (29.97%) 
|
|Alex Felsky  13,992 (27.15%) 
|
|Ken Burns  2,095 (4.06%) 
|
|Rob Ferguson  374 (0.73%) 
|
|
Brittni Mitchell,  180 (0.35%) 
  60 (0.12%) 
||
|Dave Levac
|-
| style="background:whitesmoke;"|Cambridge
Total votes: 48,201 
||
|Kathryn McGarry  18,763 (38.93%) 
|
|Rob Leone  15,694 (32.56%) 
|
|Bobbi Stewart  10,413 (21.60%) 
|
|Temara Brown  2,726 (5.66%) 
|
|Allan R. Dettweiler  605 (1.26%) 
|
|
||
|Rob Leone
|-
| style="background:whitesmoke;"|Guelph
Total votes: 53,025 
||
|Liz Sandals  22,014 (41.52%) 
|
|Anthony MacDonald  11,048 (20.84%) 
|
|James Gordon  9,385 (17.70%) 
|
|Mike Schreiner  10,230 (19.29%) 
|
|Blair Smythe  170 (0.32%) 
|
|Juanita Burnett  178 (0.34%) 
||
|Liz Sandals
|-
| style="background:whitesmoke;"|Norfolk
Total votes: 42,254 
|
|Karen Robinson  8,331 (19.72%) 
||
|Toby Barrett  22,066 (52.22%) 
|
|Ian Nichols  9,786 (23.16%) 
|
|Anne Faulkner  2,071 (4.90%) 
|
|Brad Mottashed  0 (0.00%)
|
|
||
|Toby Barrett
|-
| style="background:whitesmoke;"|Bruce
Total votes: 47,457 
|
|Colleen Schenk  14,647 (30.56%) 
||
|Lisa Thompson  18,512 (39.01%) 
|
|Jan Johnstone  10,843 (22.85%) 
|
|Adam Werstine  1,651 (3.48%) 
|
|Max Maister  323 (0.68%) 
|
|
Dennis Valenta,  128 (0.27%) 
  1,353 (2.85%) 
||
|Lisa Thompson
|-
| style="background:whitesmoke;"|Kitchener Centre
Total votes: 42,816 
||
|Daiene Vernile  18,472 (43.14%) 
|
|Wayne Wettlaufer  11,150 (26.98%) 
|
|Margaret Johnston  9,765 (22.81%) 
|
|Ronnie Smith  2,472 (5.77%) 
|
|Patrick Bernier  557 (1.30%) 
|
|
||
|John Milloy†
|-
| style="background:whitesmoke;"|Conestoga
Total votes: 46,893 
|
|Wayne Wright  15,664 (33.40%) 
||
|Michael Harris  17,083 (36.43 %) 
|
|James Villeneuve  9,958 (21.24%) 
|
|David Weber  3,277 (6.99%) 
|
|David Schumm  1,001 (2.13%) 
|
|
||
|Michael Harris
|-
| style="background:whitesmoke;"|Waterloo
Total votes: 54,860 
|
|Jamie Burton  16,534 (30.14%) 
|
|Tracey Weiler  14,450 (26.34%) 
||
|Catherine Fife  20,536 (37.43%) 
|
|Stacey Danckert  2,859 (5.21%) 
|
|James Schulz  481 (0.88%) 
|
|
||
|Catherine Fife
|-
| style="background:whitesmoke;"|Oxford
Total votes: 41,001 
|
|Daniel Moulton  8,736 (21.31%) 
||
|Ernie Hardeman  18,958 (46.24%) 
|
|Bryan Smith  10,573 (25.79%) 
|
|Mike Farlow  1,985 (4.84%) 
|
|Devin Wright  365 (0.89%) 
|
|Tim Hodges  384 (0.94%) 
||
|Ernie Hardeman
|-
| style="background:whitesmoke;"|Wellington
Total votes: 41,048 
|
|Stewart Skinner  13,585 (33.10%) 
||
|Randy Pettapiece  15,992 (38.96%) 
|
|Romayne Smith Fullerton  7,764 (18.91%) 
|
|Chris Desjardins  2,005 (4.88%) 
|
|Scott Marshall  411 (1.00%) 
|
|
Matthew Murphy (Independent),  343 (0.84%) 
Irma DeVries,  746 (1.82%) 
Robby Smink  202 (0.49%) 
||
|Randy Pettapiece
|-
| style="background:whitesmoke;"|
Total votes: 48,165 
|
|Dan Zister  14,120 (29.32%) 
||
|Ted Arnott  22,450 (46.61%) 
|
|Michael Carlucci  6,804 (14.13%) 
|
|Dave Rodgers  3,550 (7.37%) 
|
|Jason Cousineau  1,043 (2.17%) 
|
|Mitch Sproule  198 (0.41%)
||
|Ted Arnott
|}

Southwestern Ontario

|-
| style="background:whitesmoke;"|Essex
Total votes: 37,490 
|
|Terry Johnson  9,158 (24.43%) 
||
|Rick Nicholls  14,183 (37.83%) 
|
|Dan Gelinas  11,664 (31.14%) 
|
|Ken Bell  1,971 (5.26%) 
|
|Douglas McLarty  514 (3.17%) 
|
|
||
|Rick Nicholls
|-
| style="background:whitesmoke;"|London
Total votes: 45,183 
|
|Serge Lavoie  9,183 (20.32%) 
||
|Jeff Yurek  20,946 (46.36%) 
|
|Kathy Cornish  12,034 (26.63%) 
|
|John Fisher  2,236 (4.95%) 
|
| 
|
|Clare Maloney  784 (1.84%) 
||
|Jeff Yurek
|-
| style="background:whitesmoke;"|Essex
Total votes: 46,600 
|
|Crystal Meloche  6,628 (14.23%) 
|
|Ray Cecile  10,169 (21.82%) 
||
|Taras Natyshak  28,118 (60.34%) 
|
|Mark Vercouteren  1,685 (3.62%) 
|
|
|
|
||
|Taras Natyshak
|-
| style="background:whitesmoke;"|Middlesex
Total votes: 45,847 
|
|Mike Radan  9,298 (20.28%) 
||
|Monte McNaughton  20,710 (45.17%) 
|
|Joe Hill  12,160 (26.52%) 
|
|James Armstrong  2,104 (4.59%) 
|
|Matt Willson  207 (0.45%) 
|
|
Dave Durnin,  242 (0.53%) 
Bob Lewis,  558 (1.22%) 
Marinus Vander Vloet  568 (1.24%) 
||
|Monte McNaughton
|-
| style="background:whitesmoke;"|Fanshawe
Total votes: 35,508 
|
|Marcel Marcellin  7,066 (19.90%) 
|
|Chris Robson  8,196 (23.08%) 
||
|Teresa Armstrong  17,903 (50.42%) 
|
|Wil Sorrell  1,378 (3.88%) 
|
|Tim Harnick  386 (1.09%) 
|
|
Paul McKeever,  467 (1.32%) 
Ali Aref Hamadi (Independent)  112 (0.32%) 
||
|Teresa Armstrong
|-
| style="background:whitesmoke;"|London North Centre
Total votes: 45,517 
||
|Deb Matthews  16,379 (35.98%) 
|
|Nancy Branscombe  12,016 (26.40%) 
|
|Judy Bryant  13,853 (29.84%) 
|
|Kevin Labonte  2,445 (5.37%) 
|
| 
|
|
Dave McKee,  115 (0.25%) 
Salim Mansur,  639 (1.40% 
Michael Spottiswood  70 (0.15%) 
||
|Deb Matthews
|-
| style="background:whitesmoke;"|London West
Total votes: 55,106 
|
|Nick Steinburg  13,070 (23.72%) 
|
|Jeff Bennett  16,295 (29.57%) 
||
|Peggy Sattler  22,243 (40.36%) 
|
|Keith McAlister  2,310 (4.19%) 
|
| 
|
|Al Gretzky  1,188 (2.16%) 
||
|Peggy Sattler
|-
| style="background:whitesmoke;"|Lambton
Total votes: 45,650 
|
|Anne Marie Gillis  8,152 (17.56%) 
||
|Bob Bailey  18,722 (41.01%) 
|
|Brian White  16,327 (35.76%) 
|
|Kevin Shaw  2,109 (4.62%) 
|
|Andrew K. Falby  340 (0.74%) 
|
|
||
|Bob Bailey
|-
| style="background:whitesmoke;"|Tecumseh
Total votes: 36,710 
|
|Jason Dupuis 5,599 (15.25%) 
|
|Brandon Wright  2,118 (5.77%) 
||
|Percy Hatfield  22,818 (62.16%) 
|
|Adam Wright  5,493 (14.96%) 
|
|Timothy Joel Marshall  682 (1.86%) 
|
|
||
|Percy Hatfield
|-
| style="background:whitesmoke;"|Windsor West
Total votes: 36,331 
|
|Teresa Piruzza  14,001 (38.54%) 
|
|Henry Lau  5,225 (14.38%) 
||
|Lisa Gretzky  15,043 (41.40%) 
|
|Chad Durocher  1,171 (3.22%) 
|
|
|
|Helmi Charif (Independent)  891 (2.45%) 
||
|Teresa Piruzza
|}

Northern Ontario

|-
| style="background:whitesmoke;"|Manitoulin
Total votes: 26,533 
|
|Craig Hughson  6,504 (24.51%) 
|
|Jib Turner  4,589 (17.30%) 
||
|Michael Mantha  14,171 (53.41%) 
|
|Alexandra Zalucky  828 (3.12%) 
|
|Richard Hadidian  441 (1.66%) 
|
|
||
|Michael Mantha
|-
| style="background:whitesmoke;"|
Total votes: 23,157 
|
|Anthony Leek  3,652 (15.77%) 
|
|Randy Nickle  5,905 (25.05%) 
||
|Sarah Campbell  12,889 (55.66%) 
|
|Timothy McKillop  711 (3.07%) 
|
|
|
|
||
|Sarah Campbell
|-
| style="background:whitesmoke;"|Nickel Belt
Total votes: 32,107 
|
|James Tregonning  7,031 (21.90%) 
|
|Marck Blay  3,827 (11.92%) 
||
|France Gélinas  20,104 (62.62%) 
|
|Heather K. Dahlstrom  1,145 (3.57%) 
|
|
|
|
||
|France Gélinas
|-
| style="background:whitesmoke;"|Nipissing
Total votes: 31,297 
|
|Catherine Whiting  8,232 (26.78%) 
||
|Vic Fedeli  13,085 (41.81%) 
|
|Henri Giroux  8,057 (25.74%) 
|
|Nicole L. Peltier  1,188 (3.80%) 
|
|Derek Elliott  377 (1.20%) 
|
|Patrick Clement (Independent)  208 (0.66%) 
||
|Vic Fedeli
|-
| style="background:whitesmoke;"|Parry Muskoka
Total votes: 38,698 
|
|Dan Waters  10,158 (26.25%) 
||
|Norm Miller  15,761 (40.73%) 
|
|Clyde Mobbley  4,999 (12.92%) 
|
|Matt Richter  7,484 (19.34%) 
|
|
|
|Andy Stivrins  296 (0.76%) 
||
|Norm Miller
|-
| style="background:whitesmoke;"|Sault Ste. Marie
Total votes: 29,884 
||
|David Orazietti  17,490 (58.53%) 
|
|Rod Fremlin  3,704 (12.39%) 
|
|Celia Ross  7,610 (25.47%) 
|
|Kara Flannigan  965 (3.23%) 
|
|Austin Williams  115 (0.38%) 
|
|
||
|David Orazietti
|-
| style="background:whitesmoke;"|Sudbury
Total votes: 33,793 
|
|Andrew Olivier  13,296 (39.35%) 
|
|Paula Peroni  4,663 (13.80%) 
||
|Joe Cimino  14,274 (42.24%) 
|
|Casey J. Lalonde  1,212 (3.59%) 
|
|Steve Wilson  243 (0.72%) 
|
|J. David Popescu (Independent)  105 (0.31%) 
||
|Rick Bartolucci†
|-
| style="background:whitesmoke;"|Thunder Atikokan
Total votes: 28,647 
||
|Bill Mauro  15,176 (52.98%) 
|
|Harold Wilson  3,779 (13.19%) 
|
|Mary Kozorys  8,052 (28.11%) 
|
|John Northey  964 (3.37%) 
|
|Joe Talarico  547 (1.91%) 
|
|Ed Deibel  129 (0.45%) 
||
|Bill Mauro
|-
| style="background:whitesmoke;"|Thunder Superior North
Total votes: 27,725 
||
|Michael Gravelle  15,519 (55.97%) 
|
|Derek Parks  1,991 (7.18%) 
|
|Andrew Foulds  8,169 (29.46%) 
|
|Joseph LeBlanc  997 (3.60%) 
|
|Tamara Johnson  922 (3.33%) 
|
|Paul Sloan  127 (0.46%) 
||
|Michael Gravelle
|-
| style="background:whitesmoke;"|Cochrane
Total votes: 26,426 
|
|Sébastien Goyer  6,134 (23.21%) 
|
|Peter Politis  4,527 (17.13%) 
||
|John Vanthof  14,661 (55.48%) 
|
|Cody Fraser  489 (1.85%) 
|
|
|
|Gino Chitaroni  615 (2.33%) 
||
|John Vanthof
|-
| style="background:whitesmoke;"|
Total votes: 22,972 
|
|Sylvie Fontaine  5,527 (24.06%) 
|
|Steve Black  5,226 (22.75%) 
||
|Gilles Bisson  11,756 (51.18%) 
|
|Bozena Hrycyna  403 (1.75%) 
|
|
|
|Fauzia Sadiq  60 (0.26%) 
||
|Gilles Bisson
|}

 † Indicates MPP not running for re-election.

Issues

Economy 
Unemployment in Ontario was a major political issue.  In particular, the manufacturing sector had shrunk by about 30% or more than 300,000 jobs since 2002.

The Progressive Conservative Party of Ontario proposed a plan called "Million Jobs Plan", outlining their strategy for job creation and economic growth.  By reducing tax, government services, energy costs and regulations the PCs projected to create a cumulative 507,488 jobs over eight years.  The plan also called for the reduction of 100,000 civil service jobs.  Economists and critics noted fundamental mathematical errors with the PCs' projections.  They held, even if the PCs' own data were correctly tabulated, only 50,000 extra jobs would be created (in addition to the 500,000 that would be created anyway without any policy change).

The Ontario Liberal Party proposed the 10 year "Jobs and Investment Plan", which proposed infrastructure investments as their main strategy to create jobs.

The Ontario New Democratic Party platform called for targeted tax credits and incentives to encourage job creation.

The Green Party of Ontario policy proposal stated that it would "focus on your job by lowering payroll taxes for small businesses" as well as investing in transit infrastructure and subsidising energy-saving home improvements.

The Ontario Libertarian Party called for mass privatization, lower taxes and general deregulation, eliminating many business requirements such as permitting, insurance and certification that they considered to be interfering with job creation.  Their platform called for government spending to be limited to "only core functions of government; defending life, liberty, and property" and as such would have eliminated industry subsidies or incentives of any kind, particularly in the energy sector.

The Communist Party of Ontario called for raising the minimum wage to $19 as well as introducing a guaranteed annual income, nationalization of the domestic steel industry, and investments in public housing, infrastructure and social programs, while shifting taxes from lower to higher income-earners and businesses.

Transit 
Due to rapid urban and suburban expansion in southern Ontario, traffic congestion had been increasing greatly. A 2013 study by the CD Howe Institute determined that it was costing $7.5-11 billion annually for the economy of Toronto alone.

The Liberals promised $29 billion in infrastructure spending, $15 billion of which would go towards building new transit (mostly LRT) lines in the GTHA, based on the outline of Metrolinx's The Big Move plan, as well as an LRT in Ottawa. A high-speed rail line crossing the province from the southeast into Quebec was also planned. The PCs promised to finish building the Eglinton Crosstown, but cancel all the other planned lines, and instead focus on quickly expanding GO service. The NDP plan was similar to the Liberal plan, but included an extra $1 billion to get certain projects built faster.

Endorsements

Media endorsements 
The following media outlets made endorsements during the campaign:

Liberal
 Toronto Star
 Now
 Torontoist

Progressive Conservative
 Burlington Post, The Flamborough Review, Oakville Beaver (Same editorial printed in several papers)
 The Globe and Mail (endorsing a minority government)
 National Post
 Ottawa Citizen
 Toronto Sun, Ottawa Sun (Identical editorial printed in multiple cities)
 Windsor Star

New Democratic Party
 Sudbury Star  (endorsing a minority government)

Explicitly not endorsing any party
 Hamilton Spectator
The Kitchener-Waterloo Record

Public figure endorsements 
The media has reported the following endorsements by public figures during the campaign:

 Deputy Mayor of Toronto, and acting mayor, Norm Kelly endorsed Liberal leader Kathleen Wynne.
 Mayor of Mississauga, Hazel McCallion endorsed Liberal leader Kathleen Wynne.
 Mayor of Kitchener, Carl Zehr endorsed Liberal leader Kathleen Wynne.

See also
Independent candidates, 2014 Ontario provincial election

References

External links

 Elections Ontario

2014
2014 elections in Canada
2014 in Ontario
June 2014 events in Canada